Passages is a collaborative chamber music studio album co-composed by Ravi Shankar and Philip Glass, released in 1990 through Private Music. Consisting of arrangements by each of the composers around themes written by the other, the album's content is a hybrid of Hindustani classical music and Glass' distinct American minimal contemporary classical style. The album reached a peak position of number three on Billboard Top World Music Albums chart.

Reception

AllMusic's Jim Brenholts called the music "brilliant". Benholts wrote that Shankar's "smooth" style and Glass' dissonant orchestrations mixed well, and recommended Passages to fans of other minimalist composers such as John Cage, Steve Reich and Terry Riley.

Track listing
 "Offering" (Ravi Shankar)– 9:47
 "Sadhanipa" (Philip Glass) – 8:37
 "Channels and Winds" (Glass) – 8:00
 "Ragas in Minor Scale" (Glass) – 7:37
 "Meetings Along the Edge" (Shankar) – 8:11
 "Prashanti" (Shankar) – 13:40

Track listing adapted from Allmusic.

Personnel

 Tim Baker – violin
 S. P. Balasubrahmanyam – vocals
 Seymour Barab – cello
 Al Brown – viola
 Ashit Desai – conductor
 Blaise Dupuy – engineer
 Barry Finclair – viola, violin
 Mayuki Fukuhara – violin
 Jeannie Gagné – voices
 Jon Gibson – soprano saxophone
 Philip Glass – performer, producer
 Peter Gordon – French horn
 Regis Iandiorio – violin
 Rory Johnston – executive producer
 Karen Karlsrud – violin
 Abhiman Kaushal – tabla
 Jack Kripl – alto saxophone, flute
 Suresh Lalwani – arranger, conductor, mixing, orchestral assistant, producer
 Regis Landiorio – violin
 Beverly Lauridsen – cello
 Batia Lieberman – cello
 Ronu Mazumdar – flute
 Michael McGrath – assistant engineer
 Kurt Munkacsi – producer
 Keith O'Quinn – trombone
 Richard Peck – alto saxophone, tenor saxophone
 Melanie Penny – art direction
 Martin Perlich – liner notes
 Lenny Pickett – alto saxophone, tenor saxophone
 Alan Raph – trombone
 Michael Riesman – conductor, mixing, piano
 Ebet Roberts – photography
 Partha Sarathy – sarod, veena
 Sergiu Schwartz – violin
 Ron Sell – French horn
 Ravi Shankar – arranger, orchestration, performer, producer, vocals
 Shubho Shankar – sitar
 Richard Sortomme – viola
 T. Srinivasan – drum sounds, mridangam
 A.R. Swaminathan – engineer
 Masako Yanagita – viola, violin
 Frederick Zlotkin – cello

Credits adapted from Allmusic.

Charts
In the United States, Passages reached a peak position of number three on Billboard Top World Music Albums chart.

See also

 List of compositions by Philip Glass
 Ravi Shankar discography

References

1990 albums
Private Music albums
Collaborative albums
Compositions by Philip Glass
Philip Glass albums
Ravi Shankar albums
World music albums